Stepan Vladimirovich Korotkov (born 22 August 1995) is a Russian pair skater. With former partner Anastasia Poluianova, he qualified for the 2015–16 JGP Final.

Career 
Korotkov started skating in 2001. He trained as a single skater in Kemerovo.

Korotkov began competing with Anastasia Poluianova in 2012. Coached by Valentina Tiukova and Pavel Sliusarenko at Perm Krai Sports Center in Perm, Poluianova/Korotkov made their international debut in late August 2015 at the Junior Grand Prix (JGP) competition in Riga. They were awarded the silver medal in Latvia and placed fourth at their second JGP assignment, in Linz, Austria. Their results qualified them for the 2015–16 JGP Final in Barcelona, where they finished sixth.

At Russian Nationals, Poluianova/Korotkov ranked tenth on the senior level and sixth at the junior event. They parted ways at the end of the season.

Programs 
(with Poluianova)

Competitive highlights 
JGP: Junior Grand Prix

With Poluianova

References

External links 

 

1995 births
Russian male pair skaters
Living people
Sportspeople from Kemerovo